Sawal Dher is an historic village in Mardan District of Khyber Pakhtunkhwa, Pakistan, that contains the remains of an ancient city. The village is located 10 kilometers southwest of Katlang-Jamal Ghari, most of the relics of this site are now in Museum. This site is situated at a distance of 4 kilometers in the southwest of Jamal Garhi. Most of the sculptures of this monastery are preserved in Peshawar and Lahore Museums. It is 19 km away from the district capital Mardan.

The population of Sawaldher, according to the 1998 census, is about 40,000. The following Pakhtun tribes live in Sawal Dher: Roghani, Khattak, Yousafzai, Miangaan, Gujeraan, Chamyaraan, Kolalaan, Qasabaan, and Awankhel. Main occupations are farming, business and employment. A small and low-level woodcutting industry exist in the village. Moreover, the linked villages (also part Sawal Dher) Guli Bagh and Musa Khatt are situated 3 kilometres northeast and are famous for their gardening and plantation sales outlets.

History
Sawal Dher is a region with ancient history in the subcontinent. Most of the sculptures of this monastery are preserved in Peshawar and Lahore museum. A grand mosque and Hujra were constructed by forefathers of the village long before on a high plot of land. It is a very spacious Grand Masque named as Masjid-e-Bala and a traditional gathering place(Hujra)named as Bara Hujra. It is said that this place is 5,000 years old and relating to the Buddha era. Moreover, it is believed and reported that this Grand Mosque of the village was constructed on the ruins of a Buddhist Stupa. Sawal Dher was built and developed by three main families, i.e.  Roghani, Khattak and Awan, they come from various parts of Pakhtun Land and settled here. After some time people of nearby Katlang, a big town in area, try to kick out the people of Sawal Dher, but the brave people become united against those invaders and ousted them. Later on, the people of village Sawal Dher also win a lawsuit in British Raj Courts against the establishment of the village. Settlement of the irrigated land was done during the British Raj. People in the village live on the principles of harmony, equality and brotherhood. Sawal Dher has a unique status in Pakhtun Land Few families have higher amount of land than average, include wazir dad known as barbarian. In 1840 he fought against British Raj.

Facilities
There is one higher secondary school for boys and one Government Degree College for girls, besides several primary schools. There is one RHC Hospital at village Sawal Dher. Sui Gas supply is also available in Sawal Dher.

Recently, a new Darul Uloom has come into existence under the name "Darul Uloom ZAKREYA" alongside an Orphan Home for Children named "Aaghosh Barkat" - Please note: "Aagosh Barkat Orphan Home" is under construction and deeply needs donations from the public, for its successful completion. which is located near palosai sawal dher road. Adding few words to the Darul Uloom Zakreya, its just constructed in less than one year under the supervision of Maulana Irfan Ullah, a well-known Social Worker and Ex- District Committee Member of Education for Mardan district, Khyber Pakhtunkhwa. The Darul Ollom Zakreya provide mandatory Islamic Education, Computer Education, and Schooling for their students. It will be having a Hostel facility also (in the near and sooner future), which is under fast construction and again it needs donations from the Public atm (at the moment). The Darul Ollom will need donations on a regular basis as the Hostel residents will no longer be needed to pay for their services, expenses, and other utilities - The donations from the Public will be Sadqa Jareya. 

Further updates will come once the Orphan home and resident Hostel finishes construction.

Geography
The main sources of the irrigation are canals. The Upper Swat canal irrigates Sawal Dher, besides, irrigation is done by tube-wells and lift irrigation. The major crops grown in the village are wheat, sugarcane, tobacco, maize, rice, rapeseed, and mustard. Fruits and vegetables are also grown. The important fruits are orange, plum, peach, apricot, pear, mango and apple but on very limited scale. The most common diet is bread, which is made of wheat or maize flour. The people of the area are fond of meat; various forms of beef cooked in the shape of chapli kebab, seekh kebab, tikkas.

Climate
A steep rise in temperature is observed from May to June. Due to intensive cultivation and artificial irrigation, the tract is humid and heat is oppressive. However, the average daily temperature falls quite steeply from October onward. The coldest months are December and January. Most of the rainfall occurs in the months of July, August, December and January. August is the wettest month, with the highest recorded precipitation at 125.8 mm. Towards the end of the cold season, there are occasional thunderstorms and hail storms. The relative humidity is quite high throughout the year, while 73% maximum humidity has been recorded in December.

References

External links
A Book On Sawal Dher By Hafiz Sherin Gul
sawaldher
Sawal Dher Blog
Sawal Dher Map
[KAKAKHAIL TRIBE]

Buddhist monasteries in Pakistan
Populated places in Mardan District